Lu Xiong is a minor character featured within the classic Chinese novel Fengshen Yanyi. 

Lu Xiong was a renowned commanding general who served under the Shang Dynasty for many years. At the time of the Su Hu arc, Lu would inform the king that it would not be best to send Chong Houhu as the coalition leader, for many lives will be taken away in an unnecessary fashion. Thus, Lu Xiong would tell the king to give the Imperial Battle Axe to Ji Chang. 

During the Queen Jiang arc, Lu would be chosen as the head guard of the Nine Dragon Bridge while King Zhou headed out to the Demarcation Building. During the time of Jiang Huan's personal attack upon the king, Lu would not seem to remember anything of such the following day.

Lu Xiong was appointed as the deity of Shuide Star (水德星) in the end.

Notes

References
 Investiture of the Gods chapter 2 and 7

Investiture of the Gods characters
Chinese gods